Edayil Madhom is one of the four ancient South Indian madhoms that propagate Adwaita or Non dualism. It is located at Thrissur City in Kerala.

References 

Madhoms in Thrissur
Festivals in Thrissur district
Hindu pilgrimage sites in India
Religious organisations based in India